"Gott erhalte Franz den Kaiser" ("God Save Emperor Franz") is an anthem to the Austrian Emperor Francis II, set to music by Joseph Haydn. The anthem served as the national anthem of Austria-Hungary.

The German lyrics were written by Lorenz Leopold Haschka (1749–1827). The anthem was translated and adapted into many of the languages that were spoken in the Empire.

Hungarian

Tartsa Isten, óvja Isten
Királyunk s a közhazát!
Erőt lelve a szent hitben
Ossza bölcs parancsszavát!
Hadd védnünk ős koronáját
Bárhonnét fenyítse vész!
Magyar honnal Habsburg trónját
Egyesíté égi kéz
May God keep, may God protect
Our King and his parliament!
Finding strength in the holy faith
may it share in his wise command!
Let us protect his ancient crown
From wherever calamity would threaten it! 
Hungarian homeland with Habsburg throne
Was united by the celestial hand.

Czech

Translation of the Austrian anthem during the reign of Franz Joseph I (1848–1916)
Lidová hymna
Zachovej nám, Hospodine
Císaře a naši zem
Dej, ať z víry moc mu plyne
Ať je moudrým vladařem
Hajme věrně trůnu Jeho
Proti nepřátelům všem
Osud trůnu Habsburského
Rakouska je osudem.

Plňme věrně povinnosti
Braňme právo počestně
A když třeba, s ochotností
V boj se dejme statečně
Na paměti věčné mějme
Slávu vojska vítěznou
Jmění, krev i život dejme
Za Císaře, za vlast svou!

Čeho nabyl občan pilný
Vojín zbraní zastávej
Uměním i vědou silný
Duch se vzmáhej, jasně skvěj
Bože račiž přízeň dáti
Naší vlasti milené
Slunce Tvé ať věčně svítí
Na Rakousko blažené.

Stůjme k sobě v každou chvíli
Svornost jenom moci dá
Spojené kde vládnou síly
Vše se snadno překoná
Když se ruka k ruce vine
Tak se dílo podaří
Říš Rakouská nezahyne
Sláva vlasti, Císaři!

Císaři po boku vládne
Rodem, duchem spřízněná
V kráse, která neuvadne
Císařovna vznešená
Bože račiž přízeň svoji
Habsburskému domu dát
Františkovi Josefovi
Alžbětě rač požehnat!
Almighty God, save our Emperor,
Almighty God, save our land!
Use our faith to give him power!
Let him be our wise ruler!
We shall protect his holy throne
against all our enemies!
The destiny of the Habsburg throne
is the destiny of Austrian lands!

We shall follow our laws truly,
We shall protect all our laws
And if needed, with all loyalty
we shall battle fearlessly
We shall remember, you gratefully
Our victorious armies!
Property, blood, and our lives we will give
for our Emperor, for our Empire!

What was given to good people
our soldiers should protect!
Strong by knowledge, strengthened by all its art
spirit of our lands will grow!
God, please wish glory to our land
God, bless our loved homeland!
Your light, your sun, shall light peacefully
Upon Austria, our blessed land!

Let us stand together at all times,
Only unity gives power.
Where united powers reign
All struggles are easier.
When a hand reaches out to another,
The work meets success.
The Austrian Empire will not fall,
Glory to our land, to the Emperor!

By the Emperor’s side
Reigns bound by spirit and house,
In beauty, which doesn’t fade,
The Excellent Empress.
God, may you give your favour
To the Habsburg house.
Francis Joseph,
Elisabeth may you bless!

Croatian
KraljevkaIlustrovani list, No 34, Year IV, Zagreb, 1914, page 1. (also called; Carevka)
Bože živi, Bože štiti
Kralja našeg i naš dom.
Vječnom Ti ih slavom kiti,
Snagom Ti ih jačaj svom.
Ti nam sretne dane množi,
Habsburškoj ih kući daj,
S njenom snagom zauvijek složi
Hrvatske nam krune sjaj.

Ti u našim stvori grud'ma
Živi ponos, krotku ćud,
Da smo mili svijem ljud'ma,
Na poštenju prvi svud.
Ti nas krijepi svojom vjerom,
Ravnaj naše sreće brod,
Da nam pođe pravim smjerom
Sav naš složan mili rod.

No kad domu zlo zaprijeti,
"U boj!" zovne Kraljev glas,
Tad na ovaj poziv sveti
Lavom budi svaki nas,
Da pred stijegom našim gine
Dušman svaki, Bože daj!
A nad nama s nova sine
Blagog mira vedri sjaj!

Bože živi, srećom zlati
Kraljevski nam sjajni dom,
Naša ljubav nek ga prati
Do kraj međa žiću tom;
Blago, život Kralju svome
Svaki od nas rado daj,
Vječan bud' na svijetu tome
Slavne naše krune sjaj.
 
God save, God protect
Our King and our Homeland.
With Eternal glory You adorn them,
With your force You strengthen them,
Joyful days You multiply,
And to the House of Habsburg grant them,
With its power may for ever bound
The splendor of the Croatian Crown.

Polish
Hymn Ludowy
Boże wspieraj, Boże ochroń
Nam Cesarza i nasz kraj,
Tarczą wiary rządy osłoń,
Państwu Jego siłę daj.
Brońmy wiernie Jego tronu,
Zwróćmy wszelki wroga cios,
Bo z Habsburgów tronem złączon
Jest na wieki Austrii los.

Obowiązkom swoim wierni
Strzeżmy pilnie świętych praw
W ich obronie niech się spełni
powołanie do cnych spraw!
Pomni, jak to skroń żołnierza
Świetnie zdobi lauru krzew
Nieśmy chętnie za Monarchę,
Za Ojczyznę mienie, krew!

Ludu pilnej pracy zbiory
Niech osłania zbrojna moc
Niechaj kwitną ducha twory
Niech rozświetla światło noc!
Austrii Boże daj wsławienie
Na szczyt chwały racz ją wznieść
Słońca swego skłoń promienie
Ku jej chwale, na jej cześć!

Spólność, jedność powołania,
Niech przenika wszystkek lud,
Bo złączonych sił działania
Zdolne przemóc wszelki trud.
Dążąc społem ku celowi,
Chciejmy bratnio siły zlać,
Szczęść Monarsze, szczęść Krajowi,
Austria będzie wiecznie trwać!

Przy Cesarzu mile włada
Cesarzowa pełna łask,
Cały lud Jej hołdy składa,
Podziwiając cnót Jej blask.
Franciszkowi Józefowi
I Elżbiecie, Boże szczęść,
Habsburskiemu szczęść Domowi;
Sława Jemu, chwała, cześć!
 
God, support, God, protect
The Emperor for us, and our land;
Shield His reign with the shield of faith,
Give strength to His country.
Let us defend His throne faithfully,
Let us reverse every strike of enemy,
Because to the Habsburg's throne is bound
For ages the fate of Austria.

Slovene
Cesarska
Bog ohrani, Bog obvari
nam cesarja, Avstrijo!
Modro da nam gospodari
s svete vere pomočjo.
Branimo mu krono dedno
zoper vse sovražnike,
s habsburškim bo tronom vedno
sreča trdna Avstrije.

Za dolžnost in za pravico
vsak pošteno, zvesto stoj;
če bo treba, pa desnico
s srčnim upom dvigni v boj!
Naša vojska iz viharja
prišla še brez slave ni:
vse za dom in za cesarja,
za cesarja blago, kri!

Meč vojščaka naj varuje,
kar si pridnost zadobi;
bistri duh pa premaguje
z umetnijo, znanostmi!
Slava naj deželi klije,
blagor bod' pri nas doma:
vsa, kar solnce se obsije,
cveti mirna Avstrija!

Trdno dajmo se skleniti:
sloga pravo moč rodi;
vse lahko nam bo storiti,
ako združimo moči.
Brate vode vez edina
nas do cilja enega:
živi cesar, domovina,
večna bode Avstrija!

In s cesarjem zaročnica,
ene misli in krvi,
vlada milo cesarica,
polna dušne žlahtnosti.
Kar se more v srečo šteti,
večni Bog naj podeli:
Franc Jožefu, Lizabeti,
celi hiši Habsburški!

Romanian

Doamne ține și protege, Tara și pe Împărat, 
Să domnească ’nţelepţeşte, pe dreptate răzimat, 
Strămoșeasca lui cunună, de dușmani s'o apărăm, 
De-a Habsburgei 'nalte throane, soarta țărei s'o legăm!

Pentru drept și datorință, s'avem simț bun și curat, 
Și cerând o trebuință, a ne bate pentru stat, 
Să pășim cu energie, oferind sânge și stări, 
Pentru-a noastră 'mpărăție, pentru-a Patriei ușurări! 

Cetățeanul blând să-și strângă, din silinț-al său venit, 
Arta și știința 'nvingă, apărate de spirit, 
Verse ceriul dar spre țară, și cu daruri și măriri, 
Ca ș-un soare primăvară, viei țării fericiri! 

Toți să fim într' sîmțîre, toți la un scop alergând, 
Dulcea Patriei fericire, de 'mpreună 'naintând, 
Toți din inimă frățească, să dorim neîncetat, 
Țara noastră să 'nflorească, sub Cezarul Împărat!

 
God hold and protect, Our Fatherland and the Emperor,
As the shadow of the Holy Justice, May he reign wisely,
His ancestoral crown, we shall defend from the enemies,
To the Habsburg's Great Thrones, The fate of our country shall be united!

For justice and needs, we shall have a good and clean sense,
And asking the need to defend the fatherland,
Let's all all march with energy, giving all our blood and feelings,
For our Empire, for the fatherland's well being!

The kind citizen shall work hard for his sallary,
Art and Science shall reign, defended by the Holy Spirit!
Heavens shall spread to all our country glory and gifts,
Like a sun in summer, Long live the fatherland's joy!

We shall all be united in one feeling, and running towards the same goal,
The dear fatherland's happiness, we shall strive for it together,
All of us with one brotherly heart, we shall wish eternaly,
For the fatherland to blossom, under the Kaiser Emperor!

(Andrei Mureșanu version)

Banat Romanian dialect
Doamne sânte, întăreşce
Pră al nostru Împărat!
Să domnească ’nţelepţeşce
Pe dreptate răzimat!
Părintescule-i coroane
Credincios să-i aperăm:
De-a Habsburgei ’nalte troane
Soartea noastră s’o legăm!

 
Holy Lord, defend
Our Emperor!
He shall reign wisely
Always supporting justice!
His ancestor's crown
We shall defend it with faith:
To the Habsburg's Great Thrones
Our fate shall be united with!

(Older version)

Italian
Inno patriottico or Inno popolare
Serbi Dio l'austriaco regno
Guardi il nostro imperator!
Nella fé che gli è sostegno
Regga noi con saggio amor
Difendiamo il serto avito
Che gli adorna il regio crin
Sempre d'Austria il soglio unito
Sia d'Asburgo col destin.

Pia difesa e forte insieme
Siamo al dritto ed al dover;
E corriam con lieta speme
La battaglia a sostener!
Rammentando le ferite
Che di lauri ci coprir;
Noi daremo beni e vite
Alla patria, al nostro Sir.

Dell'industria a' bei tesori
Sia tutela il buon guerrier;
Incruenti e miti allori
Abbian l'arti ed il saper!
Benedica il Cielo e renda
Glorioso il patrio suol,
E pacifico risplenda
Sovra l'Austria ognora il sol!

Siam concordi, in forze unite
Del potere il nerbo sta;
Alte imprese fian compite,
Se concordia in noi sarà.
Siam fratelli, e un sol pensiero
Ne congiunga e un solo cor;
Duri eterno questo Impero,
Salvi Iddio l'Imperator!
 
God keep the reign of Austria,
And keep our emperor!
In the faith that is his support
May he rule us with wise love.
Let us defend the ancestral garland
That adorns his royal hair.
May the united throne of Austria
Always be with the fate of Habsburg.

Let us be together a pious and strong defense
Of right and duty;
And let us with happy hope run
To sustain the battle!
Remembering the wounds
That covered us with laurels;
We will give possessions and lives
To country and lord.

To the beautiful treasures of industry
May the good warrior be guardian;
May skills and learning
Have bloodless and gentle triumphs!
May Heaven bless and make
Glorious our country's ground,
And may the sun always shine peacefully
Over Austria!

Let us be in agreement; in united strength
Is the core of power;
Old undertakings will be completed
If there is concord among us.
Let us be brothers, and may one thought
And one heart join us;
May this Empire last eternally,
God save the Emperor!

Ukrainian (Ruthenian)
According to 19th century Western Ukrainian orthography, with current official Latin transliteration.
Народний гімн
Боже, буди покровитель
Цїcарю, Єго краям!
Крiпкий вiрою правитель,
Мудро най проводить нам!
Прадїдну Єго корону
Боронїм від ворога,
Тїсно із Габсбурґів троном
Сплелась Австриї судьба!
 
Bozhe, budy pokrovytel'
Cisariu, Ieho kraiam!
Kripkyj viroiu pravytel',
Mudro nai provodyt' nam!
Pradidnu Ieho koronu
Boronim vid voroha,
Tisno iz Habsburgiv tronom
Splelas' Avstryi sud'ba!
 
God, be the protector
for the Emperor and His lands!
A ruler strong with faith,
May he lead us wisely!
His crown of great-grandfathers,
Let us defend from the enemy,
Tightly to the Habsburg's throne
The fate of Austria has been bound!

Friulian (dialect of Gorizia) 
Chiant popolar
Dio mantegni d'Austria il Regno,
Uardi il nostri Imperatòr!
Nela fede – a Lui sostegno –
Nus guviarni cun amòr.
Difindìn chel diadema
Che la front circonda al GRAND
Ciarz, che l'Austria no trema
Sin che Absburgo le al command.

Cun pietàt a fuarza unida
Sostignìn lis lez del Stat;
Sei speranza nostra guida
Quand che il nostri braz combàt.
Sì! – pensand ala vitoria
Che nus spieta – vulintir
Bens e vita par la gloria
Ualìn dà del nostri Sir!

Del'industria al'opulenza
Sein tutela i boins soldàz
E i mistirs, lis arz, la scienza
Sein d'aloro coronàz.
Benedis, o Cil! la tiara
Che noaltris abitìn,
E, o soreli! tu risclara
Simpri d'Austria il faust destin.

La concordia nus unissi
Che la fuarza ja in ta man
Grandis chiossis van compissi
Se d'acordo dug saràn.
Fradis siin e atòr a un perno
Zirin ment e nostri amòr;
Duri chist biel Regno eterno:
Salvi Dio l'Imperatòr!

References

Historical national anthems
Translations
National symbols of Austria-Hungary
European anthems

sk:Gott erhalte Franz den Kaiser